Styggmann  or Styggemann is the highest mountain of Skrimfjella in southern Norway.

A legend about the mountain claims it used to be the home of a troll. The troll hated people walking on his mountain, disturbing his rest, so he used to lie on top of the mountain to scare them away. If someone came too close, he threw rocks and boulders at them. If you walk the path to Sørmyrseter, you can still see some of them. The troll was careful only to be outside when it was cloudy, but once he was surprised by the sun and turned to stone. You can still clearly see its nose, mouth and chin if you look from the right angle, which is where the mountain has its name from; the ugly man.

Mountains of Viken